Skald in Veum are a Swedish unblack metal band. They have released one extended play, 1260 Days (2015), with Rottweiler Records and SkyBurnBlack Records and a studio album, Stridslysten, via Rottweiler in 2019.

Background 
The band originated in Sweden, where they formed in 2013, with vocalist, Mund, guitarist and drummer, Resh, guitarist and bassist, Zhajiin, and their spiritual leader, Heth.

Music history 
The band are signed to Rottweiler Records, on 30 October 2015, they released, 1260 Days, an extended play.

Members 
Current members
 Mund – vocals
 Resh – guitars, drums
 Zhajiin – guitars, bass
 Heth – Spiritual leader, ideologist

Discography 
EPs
 1260 Days (30 October 2015, Rottweiler/SkyBurnsBlack)

Studio albums
 Stridslysten (12 April 2019, Rottweiler)

References

External links 

Swedish musical groups
Musical groups established in 2013
Rottweiler Records artists
2013 establishments in Sweden